Broken Anatomy was an American funeral doom metal band, originating in Clifton, New Jersey, that is influenced by the bands Evoken, Disembowelment, Dark Castle (band), and Cianide. Broken Anatomy is one of the first doom metal bands to be fronted by an openly LGBT woman. The band has released two studio albums, one demo, and two EPs, and their album The Lazarus Regret features Paul Kuhr of Novembers Doom on guest vocals.

Members
Current
Samantha Michelle Smith – Guitars, Vocals, Bass, Drums, Keyboards (2011–present)
Stuart Prickett – Guitars (2013–present)

Guest
Paul Kuhr - Guest Vocals on The Lazarus Regret

Discography

Studio albums
 The Obsession (2012)
 The Lazarus Regret (2014)

Demos
 A Shadow Deemed Worthy (2012)

EPs
 Freedom Within (2012)
 Nightmares From an Unremembered Age (2013)

References 

American death metal musical groups
American doom metal musical groups
Heavy metal musical groups from New Jersey
Musical groups established in 2011
2011 establishments in New Jersey